Armidale railway station turntable is a heritage-listed railway turntable at 216 Brown Street, Armidale, Armidale Regional Council, New South Wales, Australia. The property is owned by the Transport Asset Holding Entity (State Government). It was added to the New South Wales State Heritage Register on 2 April 1999.

History

Description

Heritage listing 
Railway Turntable was listed on the New South Wales State Heritage Register on 2 April 1999.

See also

References

Attribution 

New South Wales State Heritage Register
Armidale
Rail infrastructure in New South Wales
Articles incorporating text from the New South Wales State Heritage Register